The Kulwin railway line is located in north-western Victoria, Australia. It junctions from the Robinvale line at Korong Vale and only sees usage by freight trains.

History

The line was opened from Korong Vale to Wycheproof in 1883, and extended to Sea Lake in 1893, to Nandaly in 1914, Mittyack in 1919, and Kulwin in 1920. Access to the line was originally from the Bendigo line via Bridgewater, until the opening of the Dunolly to Inglewood route to the Mildura line in 1888.

The last regular passenger service on the line ran from Bendigo to Sea Lake on 7 May 1977 and was operated by a DERM. In April 2008 it was announced that the Korong Vale – Charlton section of the line would be upgraded as part of the Victorian core grain network, in a $23.7 million package with 6 other lines.

In February 2010, baulks were placed across the line just north of Sea Lake due to the deteriorating condition of the track. As majority of grain trains only go as far as Sea Lake, this made practical sense. Furthermore, the segment between Sea Lake and Kulwin was closed due to sand drifts and sand slides in 2006 and 2008 respectively.

Current operations are as-required grain trains operated by Pacific National and Southern Shorthaul Railroad.

References

Freight railway lines in Victoria (Australia)
Railway lines opened in 1883
5 ft 3 in gauge railways in Australia